Batrachedra isochtha is a species of moth of the family Batrachedridae. It was described by Edward Meyrick and is known from South Africa.

The larvae feed on Phoenix species.

References

Endemic moths of South Africa
Batrachedridae
Moths of Africa
Moths described in 1914
Taxa named by Edward Meyrick